Horace Orlando Patterson  (born 5 June 1940) is a Jamaican historical and cultural sociologist known for his work regarding issues of race and slavery in the United States and Jamaica, as well as the sociology of development. He is the John Cowles professor of Sociology at Harvard University. His book Freedom, Volume One, or Freedom in the Making of Western Culture (1991), won the U.S. National Book Award for Nonfiction.

Early life and education
Horace Orlando Patterson was born on 5 June 1940 in Westmoreland Parish, Jamaica, to Almina Morris and Charles A. Patterson. His parents were strong supporters of Jamaica’s People National Party, the political party he grew up to serve a few decades later. His father was a local detective while his mother became a seamstress. He had six half-siblings on his father's side but was his mother’s only child. He grew up in Clarendon Parish in the small town of May Pen. He attended primary school there, then moved to Kingston to attend Kingston College. While attending Kingston College, Patterson won a Jamaica Government Exhibition scholarship in 1958. Before matriculating in 1959, he taught for a year at the Excelsior High School in Jamaica. He went on to earn a BSc in Economics with a concentration in Sociology from the University of the West Indies, Mona, in 1962. He served as president of the Economics Society, president of the Literary Society and editor of the student magazine 'the Pelican'. Patterson earned his PhD in sociology at the London School of Economics in 1965, where he wrote his PhD thesis, the Sociology of Slavery. His dissertation adviser was David Glass. He also wrote for the recently founded New Left Review, his first work being "The Essays of James Baldwin" in 1964. While in London he was associated with the Caribbean Artists Movement, whose second meeting, in January 1967, was held at the Pattersons' North London flat.

Career
Earlier in his career, Patterson was concerned with the economic and political development of his home country, Jamaica. He served as special advisor to Michael Manley, Prime Minister of Jamaica, from 1972 to 1979 while serving as a tenured professor at Harvard University. Committed to working both jobs, Patterson split his time between Jamaica and the United States. He often flew to Jamaica the day after his last lecture.

Patterson is best known for his work on the relationship between slavery and social death, which he has worked on extensively and written several books about. Other contributions include historical sociology and fictional writing with themes of post-colonialism. Patterson has also spent time analyzing social science's scholarship and ethical considerations.

Patterson currently holds the John Cowles Chair in sociology at Harvard University.

In October 2015 he received the Gold Musgrave Medal in recognition of his contribution to literature. In 2020 he was appointed a member of the Order of Merit, Jamaica's third-highest national honour.

Professional associations

 Fellow, American Academy of Arts and Sciences
 Ernest W. Burgess Fellow, American Academy of Political and Social Science
 Member, American Sociological Association

Awards
 2020: Order of Merit, Jamaica. "For his highly distinguised international contribution to Academia, West Indian Literature, Sociology, and the Epistemology of Social Culture"
 2016: Anisfield-Wolf Book Award, Lifetime Achievement
 2015: Gold Musgrave Medal
 1997: Walter Channing Cabot Faculty Prize, Harvard
 1991: National Book Award, Non-Fiction
 1983: Walter Channing Cabot Faculty Prize, Harvard
 1983: American Political Science Association
 1983: Ralph Bunche Award from Howard University for the Best Scholarly Work on Pluralism (co-winner): American
 1983: Distinguished Contribution to Scholarship (formerly Sorokin Prize): American Sociological Association
 1965: Best Novel in English (The Children of Sisyphus): Dakar Festival of Negro Arts

Selected bibliography

Academic 
The Sociology of Slavery: Black Society in Jamaica, 1655-1838. 1967; 2022(2nd Edition with new 55-page Introducton).
Ethnic Chauvinism: The Reactionary Impulse. 1977.

 Later renamed Freedom, Vol. 1: Freedom in the Making of Western Culture – winner of National Book Award
The Ordeal of Integration. 1997

The Cultural Matrix: Understanding Black Youth (with Ethan Fosse). 2015.
The Confounding Island: Jamaica and the Postcolonial Predicament. 2019.
The Paradox of Freedom: A Biographical Dialogue (with David Scott) 2023

Fiction 

The Children of Sisyphus (novel). 1965.
An Absence of Ruins (novel). 1967.
Die the Long Day (novel). 1972.

Journal Articles 
 Rethinking Black History. 1971.
 Toward a Future That Has No Past: Reflections on the Fate of Blacks in the Americas. 1972.
 Slavery: The underside of freedom. 1984.
 Ecumenical America: Global Culture and the American Cosmos. 1994.
 Culture and Continuity: Causal Structures in Socio-Cultural Persistence. 2004.
 Cross-National Cultural Diffusion: The Global Spread of Cricket. 2005.
 The Culture of Sports. 2014.
 Making Sense of Culture. 2014.
 Race, Gender and Liberal Fallacies. 2014.
From one Out-In to another: What’s missing in Wacquant’s structural analysis. 2015.
Freedom, Slavery, and Identity in Renaissance Florence: The Faces of Leon Battista Alberti. 2017.
Modern Trafficking, Slavery, and Other Forms of Servitude. 2018.
The denial of slavery in contemporary American sociology. 2019.

Opinion Pieces 

 The Real Problem with America's Inner Cities. 2015.

 The Secret of Jamaica's Runners. 2016.

References

External links
 Profile at Harvard University
 

1940 births
Black studies scholars
Alumni of the London School of Economics
American sociologists
Caribbean Artists Movement people
Fellows of the American Academy of Political and Social Science
Harvard University faculty
Historians of slavery
Jamaican academics
Jamaican emigrants to the United States
Jamaican expatriates in the United Kingdom
Living people
National Book Award winners
Recipients of the Musgrave Medal
Recipients of the Order of Merit (Jamaica)
Critics of political economy